Dirk III may refer to:

 Dirk III, Count of Holland from 993 to 1039 
 Dirk III van Brederode (ca. 1308 – 1377)